Subhash Alias Rajan Kashinath Naik is an Indian politician from the state of Goa. He is a first term member of the Goa Legislative Assembly. Rajan Naik is a former football defender, who excelled for his village team. Rajan Naik is known to be a clean and honest man in his village. Rajan Naik has been a two-time Cuncolim Municipal councilor prior to his successful stint as MLA of Cuncolim constituency. Rajan's family has been ardent football fans since time immemorial, and his family has been supporting football in Cuncolim. Rajan continues to be the same honest person even after his entry into politics, Rajan Naik made serious efforts towards identifying and helping the government acquire the land for the NIT-Goa while he was the MLA. It was because of Rajan's dedication and constant persuasion that the NIT-Goa campus will be a reality in the village of Cuncolim.

Constituency
He represents the Cuncolim constituency.

Committees in the Goa Legislative Assembly
He is a member of the following committees in the house in the Sixth Legislative Assembly 2012.

Member		Committee on Public Undertakings
Member		Committee on Delegated Legislation
Member		Committee on Government Assurances
Member		Select Committee on The Goa School Education

External links 
 Member of the Goa Legislative Assembly
Bharatiya Janata Party Members of the Goa Legislative Assembly

References 

Members of the Goa Legislative Assembly
Living people
Bharatiya Janata Party politicians from Goa
People from South Goa district
Year of birth missing (living people)